Jacques François Courtin (1672–1752) was a French painter who was particularly adept at translating genre scenes based on Dutch Golden Age examples into a contemporary setting through the use of staging and costume.  He was one of the most popular genre painters of the late 17th and early 18th centuries.

Life

Jacques François Courtin was born in Sens in 1672. He was a pupil of Louis de Boullogne, and painted the final 'May' offered to the cathedral of Notre-Dame by the goldsmiths of Paris in 1707, the subject of which was 'St. Paul preaching at Troas.' He died in Paris in 1752.

His patrons included the royal family as well as many of the important collectors in Paris.

References

External links

1672 births
1752 deaths
17th-century French painters
French male painters
18th-century French painters
People from Sens
18th-century French male artists